Ali Mohamed Yussuf) (born 1952), more commonly known as Ali Guray is a Somaliland politician. He previously served as the Director of Somaliland's Ministry of Ports and Fishing. He was also the Chairman of the National Demobilization Commission (NDC). Ali Guray is now a member of the ruling Peace, Unity, and Development Party (Kulmiye) in Somaliland.

See also 
 Abdirahman Mohamed Abdullahi
 Faisal Ali Warabe
 Musa Behi
 Ahmed Silanyo
 Dahir Riyale

References 



Living people
1952 births
Peace, Unity, and Development Party politicians
Somaliland politicians